The Ministry of Internal Affairs (МВР) or MOI  is a government ministry of the Republic of North Macedonia. The current minister is Oliver Spasovski. Assigned to the ministry are a Public Security Bureau and a Security and Counterintelligence Administration. The ministry has existed since 1944.

List of ministers

See also
 Alpha
 Tigers
 Lions
 Border Police
 Special Support Unit
 Rapid Deployment Unit
 UBK

References

External links
 

Government of North Macedonia
Law enforcement in North Macedonia
North Macedonia